Plasma diffusion across a magnetic field is an important topic in magnetic confinement of fusion plasma. It especially concerns how plasma transport is related to strength of an external magnetic field, B. Classical diffusion predicts  1/B2 scaling, while Bohm diffusion, borne out of experimental observations from the early confinement machines, was conjectured to follow 1/B scaling. Hsu diffusion predicts 1/B3/2 scaling, which is presumably the best confinement scenario in magnetized plasma.

See also

 Bohm diffusion
 Classical diffusion
 Hsu diffusion

References 

Diffusion
Plasma physics